Kristos Andrews is a British-American actor, producer, director, who is an 11-time Emmy winner.

Andrews is the only individual in history to receive Emmy wins for all three professions of acting, directing, and producing.  Moreover, he has received the record 10 Emmy wins by the age of 30.

Andrews received Emmy Awards in 2016, 2017, 2018, 2020 and 2021 for his work as the lead actor on critically acclaimed crime-drama The Bay on Peacock. Andrews has won five more Emmys as an executive producer of the series in 2015, 2016, 2017, 2018 and 2020, in addition to winning an Emmy for his work as a director.  

Since 2016, he has starred as Tyler in the Pop TV teen sitcom This Just In, for which, contrary to his usual heavy dramatic performances, he received an Emmy nomination for his comedic work as an actor.

Career 
Andrews began portraying heartthrob Pete Garrett on crime-drama The Bay when in debuted in September 2010. He was nominated for a Daytime Emmy Award for Outstanding Special Class Short Format Daytime as an executive producer of The Bay in 2012. In 2015, he won the Daytime Emmy for Outstanding New Approaches Drama Series for the series. He won again in the renamed category Outstanding Digital Daytime Drama Series in 2016, 2017, and 2018. Andrews also won the Daytime Emmy for Outstanding Actor in a Digital Daytime Drama Series for his role on The Bay in 2016, in the renamed category Outstanding Lead Actor in a Digital Daytime Drama Series in 2017, and again in 2018.

Since 2016, Andrews has starred as Tyler in the teen sitcom This Just In, for which he was also nominated for a 2017 Daytime Emmy for Outstanding Children's or Family Viewing Series as a producer.

In 2012, Andrews was the youngest producer ever nominated for an Emmy, and in 2017, he became the first person to ever win five Emmys by the age of 26.

Andrews played the lead role in the indie feature films The Southside, a biographical film based on the true story and tragic death of Robert Areizaga Jr. He received an Indie Series Award nomination for Best Lead Actor – Drama for the role. Andrews also played the lead role in A Place Called Hollywood, a satire that tells the cutting-edge story of a young man who pursues his dream in becoming a famous actor and gives a glimpse of the harsher side of Hollywood.

Andrews' acting portfolio includes the reoccurring role of Ronnie Riley on Nickelodeon's Super Sportlets and as a lead band member of Miranda Cosgrove's TV Band (iCarly). Andrews also appeared in the Craigslist Joe documentary and the foreign film, Triangle. With appearances in several national commercials including Wendy's and Best Buy.

Supplementing the acting career, Andrews is also a model, who has appeared on national print billboards for Kohl's, Vans, Zoo York and HAWK.

Filmography

Actor 
 Sportlets (2007) as Ronnie Riley
 iCarly (2008) as Band Member
 The Industry (2009) as Chris
 Super Sportlets (2010) as Ronnie Riley
 ACME Hollywood Dream Role (2011) as Buddy
 Triangle (2012) as Switch
 A Place Called Hollywood (2015) as Charlie Law
 The Southside (2015) as Robert Ariezaga Jr.
 This Just In (2016-2017) as Tyler
 A Second Chance (2017) as Brian
 Class Act (2019) as Mike Mason
 The Last Whistle (2018) as Tom
 FraXtur (2018) as Raleigh Vega
 The Bay (2010–2017) as Pete Garrett

Producer 
 Jack Rio (2008)
 Lights Out (2010)
 A Place Called Hollywood (2015)
 The Intruders (2017)
 This Just In (18 episodes, 2016–2017)
 The Bay (94 episodes, 2010–2017)

Director 
 The Bay (11 episodes, 2014)

Awards and nominations

References

External links
 

Year of birth missing (living people)
Place of birth missing (living people)
Living people
American skateboarders
American male soap opera actors